Palestinian Americans are Americans who are of full or partial Palestinian descent. It is unclear when the first Palestinian immigrants arrived in the United States, but it is believed that they arrived during the early 1900s.

History

Early immigration 
The first Palestinians who immigrated to the United States arrived after 1908, when the Ottoman Empire passed a new conscription law mandating Palestinians into the military. These Palestinians were overwhelmingly Christians, and only a minority of them were Muslims. Palestinian immigration began to decline after 1924, with a new law limiting the number of immigrants, as well as the Great Depression, which heavily reduced immigration.

Palestinian exodus 
The population in the United States began to increase after World War II. The 1948 Arab–Israeli War, and the establishment of the state of Israel in 1948 caused many Palestinians to immigrate in the 1948 Palestinian exodus, most as refugees. During the 1950s, many Christians from Ramallah started immigrating to the states, then followed by Muslims from nearby towns. However, the greatest wave of Palestinian immigration began in 1967 after the Six-Day War, or as Middle Easterners and North Africans call it the June War. This wave of immigrants reached its peak in the 1980s.

Modern history 
After the Immigration and Nationality act of 1965 was enacted, many Palestinians started immigrating again into the United States. Most Palestinians that immigrated to the United States in this period were more educated than the Palestinians that arrived before 1967, to the schools sponsored by the United Nations and the increasing number of universities in the Middle East.

Demographics

U.S cities 
Most Palestinians settled in the areas surrounding Paterson, and Bay Ridge, which together make up the New York Metropolitan Area. Many other Palestinians settled in Chicago metropolitan area, while some others settled in the Los Angeles metro area, Metro Detroit, Greater Cleveland, Metro New Orleans, Metro Jacksonville, and Metro Miami. 
Paterson, New Jersey has its southern half of the city nicknamed Little Ramallah, with an Arab American population estimated as high as 20,000 in 2015. It has the most concentrated area of Palestinian Americans in the entire United States. It is also called Little Istanbul, since it also has a growing Turkish American community.

Bay Ridge's Arab community in Brooklyn, New York, is also a significant neighborhood home to an estimated population of 35,000, in which its largest Arab ethnic groups are Palestinians and Yemenis. However, it is also home to many other Arab ethnic groups, making Bay Ridge's Arab community also a strongly diverse population. 

Chicago, Illinois is also home to a significant population of Palestinians. There is an estimated population of 85,000 Palestinians in Chicago, and Palestinians form 60% of the Arab community in the area. Bridgeview, Illinois, also has a significant population of Palestinians Americans.

According to the 2000 United States Census, there were 72,112 people of Palestinian ancestry living in the United States, increasing to 85,186 by the 2009–2013 American Community Survey. It is difficult to count the numbers of Palestinian Americans, since the United States does not recognize the State of Palestine, and only recognizes "Palestinian" as a nationality.

Religion 
Palestinian Muslim Americans practice the Sunni sect of Islam, in the Hanafi and Shafi'i madhab.

A large part of Palestinian Christians belong to the Greek Orthodox Church of Jerusalem, with a significant presence of the Latin and Melkite church followers. Smaller minorities adhere to various sects of Protestantism.

Language 
Besides English, many Palestinian Americans speak Palestinian Arabic. Palestinians who once lived or worked in Israel or the Palestinian territories may have spoken Modern Hebrew as a second language. Many Palestinians are fluent in other languages.

Education 
In the United States approximately 46% of Palestinians have obtained at least a college degree, compared to 18% of the American population. The study of culture and the Arabic language is increasingly important among Palestinians, especially in college and graduate school. Thus, some Palestinian or Arab organizations are working to monitor and improve the teaching of Arab history and culture in the American schools. Palestinians, along with Jordanians, have one of the highest education rates in the Middle East.

Socioeconomics 
Among the 90 percent of Palestinian American men and 40 percent of women who are in the labor force, 40 percent and 31 percent, have either professional, technical, or managerial positions. There are also large numbers in sales: 26 percent of men, and 23 percent of women. The self-employment rate for men is a significant 36 percent (only 13 percent for women), compared to 11 percent for non-immigrant men. Of the self-employed, 64 percent are in retail trade, with half owning grocery stores. In terms of income, the mean for Palestinian families in 1979 was $25,400, with 24 percent earning over $35,000 and 20 percent earning less than $10,000.

Culture
Palestinian culture is a blend of Eastern Mediterranean influences. Palestinians share commonalities with nearby peoples of the Levant, including Lebanese, Syrians, and Jordanians.

Cuisine 
Palestinians cook many similar foods to the Levant. Examples are kanafeh, hummus, falafel, musakhan, waraq al-'inib, and other Palestinian dishes. These foods, such as Kanafeh, have been very popular in the United States, mostly in New York City.

Business 
Palestinian Americans have owned Middle Eastern groceries, shops and restaurants ever since their immigration to the United States. Most of these businesses are in large cities such as New York City and Chicago.

Notable figures 

Edward Said was a  U.S. naturalized Palestinian professor at Columbia University, and widely known as the "Father of Orientalism". He was also a strong voice and advocate for the American Arab Anti Discrimination Committee (ADC) and studied the breaches of civil liberties of Arabs and Muslims in the United States during the 1990s and later after hijacking on September 11th 2001.

Huwaida Arraf is a Palestinian activist, author and lawyer based in the city of Ramallah who founded an organization called the International Solidarity Movement (ISM) which seeks to help the Palestinian side of the Israeli–Palestinian conflict through non-violent protests. She was also a part of a peace initiative called Seeds of Peace which sought to create communication between Palestinian and Jewish youth.

Khaled Mohamed Khaled, better known by his stage name DJ Khaled, is an American hip hop artist and record producer of Palestinian descent who rose to fame in the 2000s with the debut of his first album Listennn... the Album which reached the 12th spot on the US Billboard 200 chart.

Gigi Hadid and Bella Hadid, two sisters who are both models, are of Palestinian descent through their father Mohamed. Both sisters have expressed their public support for the Palestinian cause.

Politics

Domestic politics 

A poll in October 2016 found that 60% of Arab-American (including Palestinian-Americans) voters voted for Hillary Clinton (with 26% voting for Donald Trump). The survey found evidence of continued movement by Arab-American voters away from the Republican Party, and that 52% of voters identified as Democrats with only 26% calling themselves Republicans.

2016 Election 
Arab Americans who supported Hillary Clinton believed that addressing gun violence, health care, and Social Security were important to electing the President, however those who supported Donald Trump saw combatting terrorism, further regulating government spending, and  creating stricter immigration policies as of chief importance after "Jobs and the economy". Both groups believed Hillary Clinton to be a stronger choice when it came to improving education and resolving racial tensions.

2020 Election 
Despite 26% of Arab-Americans voting for Trump in 2016, the President's Pro-Israel policies such as the recognition of Jerusalem as Israel's capital by  moving of the American Embassy from Tel Aviv to Jerusalem have considerably lessened his support from Arab-Americans and Palestinian-Americans in particular. Initiatives such as "Yalla Vote" have formed to encourage Arab voters to register and participate in the 2020 Election and boost the number of Arab-American votes.

Foreign politics 
While Palestinian Americans are typically not more politically active than the population at large they are very politically aware of their history and the issues facing their homeland. They are more active in social organizations such as Boycott, Divestment and Sanctions (BDS), through mosques, churches and local organizations, than in larger political ones, though the former tend to have strong political implications. In the absence of a Palestinian state, the unity and preservation of communities in the diaspora serve to maintain Palestinian identity.

Government 
Ammar Campa-Najjar is a democratic candidate of Palestinian and Mexican Heritage from East County who ran for Congress to represent California's 50th congressional district in 2020. Ammar worked as a campaign official in San Diego raising awareness and helping to get President Barack Obama reelected in 2012. His opponent in the 2020 electoral season is Darrell Issa (another Arab-American of Lebanese, German and Bohemian (Czech) ancestry).

Only a couple Americans of Palestinian ancestry have served or are currently serving as members of Congress. Rashida Tlaib, an American born to Palestinian parents, is a Democratic congresswoman of the Michigan House of Representatives, who ran for  U.S. House of Representatives seat from Michigan's 13th congressional district. She became one of the first Muslim women elected to Congress (along with Somali-American Ilhan Omar of Minnesota), and the first Palestinian-American woman in Congress. Justin Amash, was a Republican-turned Independent Congressman of Palestinian ancestry, serving in the U.S House of Representatives representing Michigan's 3rd District.

At the State level, Athena Salman of the Arizona House of Representatives is of Palestinian Ancestry. Palestinian-American Iman Jodeh was elected to the Colorado House of Representatives in the 2020 United States elections.  Fady Qaddoura, born on the West Bank was elected to the Indiana Senate in 2020.

See also 
 Arab Americans
 Palestinian Christians
 Palestinian cuisine
 Palestinian diaspora
 History of Palestinians in Los Angeles
 Palestine–United States relations

References

External links 
 Palestinian American Council
 Arab Americans: Demographics 

Arab American
 
 
 
Palestinian diaspora
Middle Eastern American